Greenslopes is a suburb in the City of Brisbane, Queensland, Australia.

Geography 
There is some slight variety in the terrain, with low hills in the east and south sloping down to the flood plain of Norman Creek, which curls around the western and northern edges of the suburb on its way to join the Brisbane River at Norman Park.

The major roads are:

 Logan Road;
 The Southeast Freeway. Both Freeway and Logan Road are oriented northwest–southeast and lead from inner Brisbane to the city of Logan and other points south;
 Chatsworth Road, joining Greenslopes to suburbs further east, including Coorparoo, Camp Hill and Carina;
 Old Cleveland Road, a major arterial road which also leads eastwards but reaches almost to the shores of Moreton Bay;
 the South-East Busway, which tends to parallel the course of Norman Creek with Greenslopes busway station providing frequent and rapid services to the city;

Stephens Mountain

It is located between the Greenslopes Private Hospital located on a ridge leading east from its highest point, and the Greenslopes busway station and the Pacific Motorway to the west. The hill is low and its highest points are still covered in scrub. Norman Creek drains the areas surrounding the mountain.

Climate
Greenslopes shares Brisbane's humid sub-tropical climate, but the hot summer days are often mitigated by cooling afternoon breezes, especially in the higher areas. Winters are usually drier with very mild temperatures.

History 
Parts of the current suburb were originally opened for settlement under names such as the Dunellan, Thompson and Mount Pleasant Estates. There is still a Dunellan Street in the suburb, adjacent to the state school.

Greenslopes was named after an early estate in the area. The estate was owned by Frederick Wecker, who purchased the land in 1857 and named it after the area's green pastures.

In July 1887, "Baynes' Paddock", comprising 471 allotments, was advertised to be auctioned by Arthur Martin & Co. The allotments for sale were situated along Logan Road; Cornwall Street; Ernest Street; Beatrice Street; Vera Street; Logan Street; Adelaine Street (now Juliette Street); Reuben Street (now Zillah Street); Victor Street (now Flora Street); Arnold Street (now Lincoln Street) and Rita Street (now Regina Street). A map advertising the auction includes a local sketch that shows the nearby bus stands and South Brisbane Railway.

Greenslopes formed part of Stephens Shire until its amalgamation with over 20 other local shires into Greater Brisbane in 1925. The shire's name can still be seen on a plaque on the bridge where Juliette Street crosses Norman Creek.

Mount Pleasant Provisional School opened on 30 July 1890 with an enrolment of 65 students. It was renamed Dunellan Provisional School. In 1892 it became Dunellan State School. In 1922 it was renamed Greenslopes State School.

In 1900, a small Baptist church was built in Cedar Street. In 1913, it was moved to the north-west corner of Dunellan Street and Henry Street. On Saturday 14 October 1933 a new Greenslopes Baptist Church was officially opened on the north-west corner of Dunellan Street and Henry Street. The brick church has a  main room with a seating capacity for 300 people, a  entrance porch, together with a baptistry and vestries for both minister and choir. It is listed on the Brisbane Heritage Register.

The Brisbane City Council operated trams along Logan Road to Greenslopes from 1914 to 13 April 1969. Until 1957 a tram line also operated along Chatsworth Road, branching off the Logan Road line at Greenslopes.

Chatsworth Heights Estate bordering Logan Road was auctioned on the Saturday 14 June 1914.

In October 1925, 23 allotments bordered by Holland Street, Donaldson Street and Curd Street, were advertised to be auctioned by Isles, Love & Co, Limited. A map advertising the auction shows the nearby tram line on Chatsworth Road.

St Matthew's Anglican Church hall opened circa 1936 and closed circa 1968.

In September 1938, "Waratah Estate", made up of eight allotments bordered by Logan Road and Donaldson Street, were advertised to be auctioned by Sharp & Musgrave. A map advertising the auction states that the allotments are on the Holland Park tramline.

In 1975, the suburb of Stones Corner was absorbed into Greenslopes before officially being re-instated as a suburb of its own in November 2017.

The 2011 Census recorded 8,565 residents in Greenslopes, of whom 50.8% were female and 49.2% were male. The median age of the population was 32; five years younger than the Australian median. 64.1% of people living in Greenslopes were born in Australia, compared to the national average of 69.8%. The other most common countries of birth were India (4.3%), England (3.2%), New Zealand (3.1%), the Philippines (1.1%), and China (0.8%). 74% of people only spoke English at home, while the next most commonly spoken languages were Punjabi (1.2%), Hindi (1.1%), Mandarin (1.1%), Cantonese (0.9%), and Greek (0.9%). The most common religious affiliation was Catholic (25.7%), followed by 'No Religion' (25%), Anglican (12%), Uniting Church (3.8%), and Buddhist (3%). The suburb's population density was 2,913/km2, whereas Brisbane's was 140/km2. Most occupied dwellings were apartments (48.7%), followed by separate houses (42.6%).

Before August 2015, Greenslopes was in Holland Park Ward but from August 2015 it is in the new Coorparoo Ward with Annerley, Coorparoo, Camp Hill and Carina Heights.

In the  Greenslopes had a population of 8,936 people.

Many of the dwellings in the suburb of Greenslopes are 'character homes' of pre-war construction. Brisbane City Council purportedly recognises pre-war homes as being valuable to the identity of the suburb and enforces controls relating to the demolition and renovation of the original homes, whilst also ensuring that any new dwellings built in the suburb are reflective of traditional architecture and maintain and enhance the character of the streetscape. However, two- and three-story walk-up apartment buildings are increasingly the norm.

Heritage listings
There are a number of heritage-listings in Greenslopes:

 80 Chatsworth Road: De Aar
 Outside 81 Chatsworth Road: Tram Shelter
 43 Dunellan Street: Greenslopes Baptist Church & Hall
 55 Headfort Street: Australian Red Cross Centre
 15 Jordan Street: Chatsworth
 571 Logan Road: Greenslopes State School & Mural
 Outside 634 Logan Road: Fig Tree
 684 Logan Road: Parnwell Residence
 83 Nicholson Street: Greenslopes Private Hospital

Education
Greenslopes State School is a government primary (Prep-6) school for boys and girls at 559 Logan Road. In 2018, the school had an enrolment of 337 students with 25 teachers (21 full-time equivalent) and 11 non-teaching staff (7 full-time equivalent).

Facilities

The Greenslopes Private Hospital, formerly Repatriation General Hospital (RGH) Greenslopes operated by the Commonwealth Government Dept of Veterans Affairs (DVA) for war veterans is located within the suburb. The hospital, surrounded by quiet streets, lies some distance from the nearest main roads, a factor which has caused friction with local residents over traffic, parking and redevelopment issues in recent years.

Amenities 
The local shopping precinct is Greenslopes Mall on Logan Road. 

Other longstanding local landmarks are the Greenslopes Bowls Club.

There are a number of places of worship in Greenslopes, including:

 Greenslopes Baptist Church, corner of Henry and Dunellan Streets
 St Maroun's Maronite Catholic Church, 29 Bunya Street
Givat Zion, South Brisbane Hebrew Congregation, 46 Bunya Street

See also

 List of Brisbane suburbs

References

Further reading

External links

 
Greenslopes Private Hospital

 
Suburbs of the City of Brisbane